Samantha van Wissen (born 1970 in Roermond) is a Dutch dancer who is mostly known for her work with the Brussels-based choreographers Anne Teresa De Keersmaeker / Rosas and Thomas Hauert / ZOO.

Training and start as a dancer
She studied at the Hogeschool voor Muziek en Theater Rotterdam (High School for Music and Theater, renamed Codarts University since 2000). Afterwards she moved to Brussels and joined Rosas, the dance company of Anne Teresa De Keersmaeker, and afterwards ZOO, the dance company of Thomas Hauert.

Collaboration with Anne Teresa De Keersmaeker and Rosas
The first Rosas productions in which Samantha van Wissen danced are Erts (Anne Teresa De Keersmaeker / Rosas, 1992) and Mozart / Concert Arias. Un moto di gioia. (Anne Teresa De Keersmaeker / Rosas, 1992). Afterwards, a wide range of other new Rosas productions followed. The most recent productions are Work / Travail / Labor (Anne Teresa De Keersmaeker / Rosas, 2015) and Così fan tutte (Anne Teresa De Keersmaeker / Rosas and Opéra national de Paris, 2017). She also participated in the restaging of the Rosas productions Rosas danst Rosas (Anne Teresa De Keersmaeker / Rosas, 1983), Elena's Aria (Anne Teresa De Keersmaeker / Rosas, 1984), Bartók / Mikrokosmos (Anne Teresa De Keersmaeker / Rosas, 1987), Achterland (Anne Teresa De Keersmaeker / Rosas, 1990), Drumming (Anne Teresa De Keersmaeker / Rosas and Ictus, 1998) and Rain (Anne Teresa De Keersmaeker / Rosas and Ictus, 2001). The Rosas productions tour worldwide. She can also be seen in a number of movies and videos made about or based on Rosas productions.

Collaboration with Thomas Hauert / ZOO
In 1997, Samantha van Wissen also joined ZOO, the dance company of Brussels-based Swiss choreographer Thomas Hauert, to collaborate as a dancer on Cows in Space (Thomas Hauert / ZOO, 1998). After that another ten ZOO productions followed.

Collaboration with others
She also worked together with Fabián Barba, an Ecuadorian dancer and choreographer who studied at the dance school P.A.R.T.S. in Brussels and also collaborated with Thomas Hauert. She also danced in some productions that director Inne Goris made for children, and in a production by video artist / musician Walter Verdin.

Work as a dance teacher and artistic coach
For several years, Samantha van Wissen was a teacher (repertoire of Anne Teresa De Keersmaeker and yoga) at P.A.R.T.S., the dance school in Brussels founded by Anne Teresa De Keersmaeker. Since 2008, she has been teaching the repertoire of Anne Teresa De Keersmaeker (and contemporary dance techniques) annually at ImPulsTanz - Vienna International Dance Festival Together with Anne Teresa De Keersmaeker, Samantha van Wissen also participated in the project [Re: Rosas!], an art-based YouTube project of fABULEUS, inviting everyone to remix the chair scene from the choreography of Rosas dans Rosas (Anne Teresa De Keersmaeker / Rosas, 1983). In three instructional films they explain together step by step the different movements and the structure of the choreography.

Samantha van Wissen has also been teaching dance for fifteen years at the cultural center Westrand in Dilbeek, a Belgian municipality in the province of Flemish Brabant. She was also a contemporary dance, improvisation and movement theater coach for Danspunt.

Productions
With Anne Teresa De Keersmaeker / Rosas:
 Erts (Anne Teresa De Keersmaeker / Rosas, 1992)
 Mozart / Concert Arias. Un moto di gioia. (Anne Teresa De Keersmaeker / Rosas, 1992)
 Kinok (Anne Teresa De Keersmaeker / Rosas, 1994)
 Amor constante, más allá de la muerte (Anne Teresa De Keersmaeker / Rosas, 1994)
 Erwartung / Verklärte Nacht (Anne Teresa De Keersmaeker / Rosas, 1995)
 Woud, three movements to the music of Berg, Schönberg & Wagner (Anne Teresa De Keersmaeker / Rosas, 1996)
 Duke Bluebeard's castle (Anne Teresa De Keersmaeker / Rosas, 1998)
 Repertory Evening (Anne Teresa De Keersmaeker / Rosas, 2002)
 Verklärte Nacht (Anne Teresa De Keersmaeker / Rosas, 2014)
 Work/Travail/Arbeid (Anne Teresa De Keersmaeker / Rosas, 2015)
 Così fan tutte (Anne Teresa De Keersmaeker / Rosas and Opéra national de Paris, 2017)
Samantha van Wissen also collaborated on the restagings of the Rosas productions Rosas danst Rosas (Anne Teresa De Keersmaeker / Rosas, 1983), Elena's Aria (Anne Teresa De Keersmaeker / Rosas, 1984), Bartók / Mikrokosmos (Anne Teresa De Keersmaeker / Rosas, 1987), Achterland (Anne Teresa De Keersmaeker / Rosas, 1990), Drumming (Anne Teresa De Keersmaeker / Rosas and Ictus, 1998) and Rain (Anne Teresa De Keersmaeker / Rosas and Ictus, 2001).

With Thomas Hauert / ZOO:
 Cows in space (Thomas Hauert / ZOO, 1998) 
 Pop-Up Songbook (Thomas Hauert / ZOO, 1999)
 Jetzt (Thomas Hauert / ZOO, 2000)
 Verosimile (Thomas Hauert / ZOO, 2002)
 5 (Thomas Hauert, Mark Lorimer, Sara Ludi, Samantha van Wissen and Mat Voorter / ZOO, 2003)
 More or less sad songs (Thomas Hauert, Martin Kilvady, Sara Ludi, Chrysa Parkinson, Samantha van Wissen and Mat Voorter / ZOO, 2005)
 Walking Oscar (Thomas Hauert / ZOO, 2006)
 Puzzled (Jurgen De bruyn/Zefiro Torna and Thomas Hauert / ZOO, 2007)
 Accords (Thomas Hauert / ZOO, 2008)
 You've Changed (Thomas Hauert / ZOO, 2010)
 MONO (Thomas Hauert / ZOO, 2013)

With Inne Goris:
 Drie zusters (Inne Goris, 2003)
 Droesem (Inne Goris, 2007)

With Fabián Barba:
 A personal yet collective history (Fabián Barba, 2012)
 slugs’ garden/cultivo de babosas (Fabián Barba and Esteban Donoso, 2017)

With Walter Verdin:
 Storm (Walter Verdin, 1999)

Filmography
 Mozartmateriaal (Jurgen Persijn and Ana Torfs, 1993)
 Rosas danst Rosas (Thierry De Mey, 1997)

References

Sources
 Kunstenpunt - Persons - Samantha van Wissen according to the Flemish Arts Institute
 Vimeo channel of Thomas Hauert / ZOO

Further reading
 Patrick Jordens, Samantha Van Wissen (Rosas): 'Deze voorstelling voelt als een cadeau', in: Brussel Deze Week, 04/09/2014
 Samantha en Bart in Pop-Up-Songbook, in: Het Nieuwsblad, 23/11/2000
 Samantha van Wissen: 'Er gebeuren hier dingen die echt met je eigen leven te maken hebben' - Interview, in: Brussel Deze Week, 24/11/1999

1970 births
Living people
Dutch female dancers
People from Roermond
Date of birth missing (living people)